Norm Potter (18??–1951) was an Australian professional rugby league footballer in the 1910s and '20s. A Queensland state and Australia national representative front-row forward, he was one of Queensland's early stalwart star players, making forty-four state appearances in an unbroken representative career between 1918 and 1927.

Career
Potter's early club career was with Wests Brisbane. In 1918 he was selected and captained the first post-World War I Queensland state side. He toured New Zealand with the Australian representative side in 1919 making a sole Test appearance. He played a match for Queensland against the 1920 Great Britain Lions tourists and went on to make six further Test appearances, playing at front-row in all three Tests of both the 1920 and the 1924 domestic Ashes series against Great Britain. He made the 1921-22 Kangaroo tour of Great Britain playing in ten tour matches but he was kept out of the Test line-ups by the front-row pairing of Clarrie Prentice and Bill Schultz. In 1922 he was captain of the first ever Queensland side to beat New South Wales in the annual interstate series. After retiring as a player he became a first-grade coach in the Brisbane competition.

References

Bibliography
 Whiticker, Alan & Hudson, Glen (2006) The Encyclopedia of Rugby League Players, Gavin Allen Publishing, Sydney
 Pollard, Jack (ed) Gregory's Guide to Rugby League (1965), Grenville Publishing Sydney

Footnotes

1951 deaths
Australian rugby league players
Australia national rugby league team players
Queensland rugby league team players
History of Queensland
Year of birth missing